Philip Charles Skoglund  (20 June 1937 – 8 May 2015) was a New Zealand lawn bowls player, and part of New Zealand's greatest lawn bowls family dynasty.

Early life
Born in 1937 at Palmerston North, he was the son of politician and cabinet minister Philip Oscar Skoglund and nephew of champion lawn bowls player Pete Skoglund.

Bowls career
He was the youngest New Zealand National Bowls Championships singles champion at 20, in 1958. He competed in five World Championships (1966, 1972, 1980, 1984 & 1988), winning a gold medal (triples 1988), two silver medals (fours 1984 & 1988) and three bronzes (pairs 1980, fours 1980, triples 1984) He competed in five Commonwealth Games, 1970, 1974, 1978, 1982 and 1990 (not 1986 because of a sport-wide dispute over amateurism). He played indifferently in the singles in 1970, hence has been mainly lead in the pairs and fours skip, despite being National singles champion 1970, 1971, 1972 (and in 1958 & 1966). He won a Commonwealth Games bronze in pairs 1974 and in fours 1990; and a silver in fours, 1978.

Skoglund was appointed an Officer of the Order of the British Empire in the 1988 Queen's Birthday Honours, for services to bowls, and was inducted into the New Zealand Sports Hall of Fame in 1990. In 2013, Skoglund was an inaugural inductee into the Bowls New Zealand Hall of Fame.

Family
His son Philip Skoglund junior played for New Zealand at the 1992 World Bowls and the 1994 Commonwealth Games. Philip Skoglund junior and his brother Raymond Skoglund won the National Pairs in 1999, where Philip junior was also runner-up in the National Singles. Together they were second in the National Fours with their father and Brett O'Riley in 1991.

Personal life
Skoglund was a transport company manager and was married to Carol. He died in Palmerston North in 2015.

References 

 Who's Who in New Zealand, 12th edition 1991
 Article in New Zealand Listener, 8 January 1990, volume 126 pp20–21

External links
 

1937 births
2015 deaths
New Zealand male bowls players
Commonwealth Games bronze medallists for New Zealand
Commonwealth Games silver medallists for New Zealand
Bowls players at the 1970 British Commonwealth Games
Bowls players at the 1974 British Commonwealth Games
Bowls players at the 1978 Commonwealth Games
Bowls players at the 1982 Commonwealth Games
Bowls players at the 1990 Commonwealth Games
New Zealand businesspeople
Sportspeople from Palmerston North
New Zealand Officers of the Order of the British Empire
Commonwealth Games medallists in lawn bowls
Bowls World Champions
Medallists at the 1974 British Commonwealth Games
Medallists at the 1978 Commonwealth Games
Medallists at the 1990 Commonwealth Games